The Pacific Coast Biscuit Company Building is a building located in northwest Portland, Oregon, listed on the National Register of Historic Places. The building originally housed the Portland Cracker Company and later was home to the Pacific Coast Biscuit Company.

See also
 National Register of Historic Places listings in Northwest Portland, Oregon

References

Further reading

External links

1891 establishments in Oregon
Industrial buildings and structures on the National Register of Historic Places in Portland, Oregon
Industrial buildings completed in 1891
Pearl District, Portland, Oregon
Romanesque Revival architecture in Oregon